The Beef Hormone Dispute is one of the most intractable agricultural controversies since the establishment of the World Trade Organization (WTO).

It has sometimes been called the "beef war" in the media, similarly to the UK–EU Beef war over the mad cow disease issue, creating some confusion, since these two wars overlapped in time.

In 1989, the European Union banned the importation of meat that contained artificial beef growth hormones approved for use and administered in the United States. Originally, the ban covered six such hormones but was amended in 2003 to permanently ban one hormone —estradiol-17β — while provisionally banning the use of the five others. WTO rules permit such bans, but only where a signatory presents valid scientific evidence that the ban is a health and safety measure.  Canada and the United States opposed this ban, taking the EU to the WTO Dispute Settlement Body.  In 1997, the WTO Dispute Settlement Body ruled against the EU.

History

EU ban and its background 
The hormones banned by the EU in cattle farming were estradiol, progesterone, testosterone, zeranol,  melengestrol acetate and trenbolone acetate.  Of these, the first three are synthetic versions of endogenous hormones that are naturally produced in humans and animals, and also occur in a wide range of foods, whereas the last two are synthetic and not naturally occurring, which mimic the behaviour of endogenous hormones.  Zeranol (alpha-zearalanol) is produced semi-synthetically, but it also occurs naturally in some foods.  It is one of several derivatives of zearalenone produced by certain Fusarium.  Although its occurrence in animal products can be partly due to its ingestion in such feeds, alpha-zearalanol can also be produced endogenously in ruminants that have ingested zearalenone and some zearalenone derivatives in such feeds.  The EU did not impose an absolute ban.  Under veterinary supervision, cattle farmers were permitted to administer the synthetic versions of natural hormones for cost-reduction and possibly therapeutic purposes, such as synchronising the oestrus cycles of dairy cows.  All six hormones were licensed for use in the US and in Canada.

Under the Agreement on the Application of Sanitary and Phytosanitary Measures, signatories have the right to impose restrictions on health and safety grounds subject to scientific analysis.  The heart of the Beef Hormone Dispute was the fact that all risk analysis is statistical in nature, and thus unable to determine with certainty the absence of health risks, and consequent disagreement between the US and Canada beef producers on the one hand, who believed that a broad scientific consensus existed that beef produced with the use of hormones was safe, and the EU on the other, which asserted that it was not safe.

The use of these hormones in cattle farming had been studied scientifically in North America for 50 years prior to the ban, and there had been widespread long-term use in over 20 countries.  Canada and the United States asserted that this provided empirical evidence both of long-term safety and of scientific consensus.

The EU ban was not, as it was portrayed to rural constituencies in the US and Canada, protectionism.  The EU had already had other measures that effectively restricted the import of North American beef.  In the main, the North American product that the new ban affected, which existing barriers did not, was edible offal.

Consumers expressing concern over the safety of hormone use pressured EU officials.  There were a series of widely publicized "hormone scandals" in Italy in the late 1970s and early 1980s.  The first, in 1977, was signs of the premature onset of puberty in northern Italian schoolchildren, where investigators had cast suspicion in the direction of school lunches that had used meat farmed with the (illegal) use of growth hormones.  No concrete evidence linking premature puberty to growth hormones was found, in part because no samples of the suspect meals were available for analysis.  But public anger arose at the use of such meat production techniques, to be further fanned by the discovery in 1980 of the (again illegal) presence of diethylstilbestrol (DES), another synthetic hormone, in veal-based baby foods.

The scientific evidence for health risks associated with the use of growth hormones in meat production was, at best, scant.  However, consumer lobbyist groups were far more able to successfully influence the European Parliament to enact regulations in the 1980s than producer lobbyist groups were, and had far more influence over public perceptions.  This is in contrast with the US at the time, where there was little interest from consumer organizations in the subject prior to the 1980s, and regulations were driven by a well-organized coalition of export-oriented industry and farming interests, who were only opposed by traditional farming groups.

Until 1980, the use of growth hormones, both endogenous and exogenous, was completely prohibited in (as noted above) Italy, Denmark, the Netherlands, and Greece.  Germany, the largest beef producer in the EU at the time, prohibited just the use of exogenous growth hormones.  The five other member countries, including the second and third largest beef producers, France and the United Kingdom, permitted their use.  (The use of growth hormones was particularly common in the U.K., where beef production was heavily industrialized.) This had resulted in several disputes amongst member countries, with the countries that had no prohibitions arguing that the restrictions by the others acted as non-tariff trade barriers.  But in response to the public outcry in 1980, in combination with the contemporary discovery that DES was a teratogen, the EU began to issue regulations, beginning with a directive prohibiting the use of stilbenes and thyrostatics issued by the European Community Council of Agriculture Ministers in 1980, and the commissioning of a scientific study into the use of estradiol, testosterone, progesterone, trenbolone, and zeranol in 1981.

The European Consumers' Organisation (BEUC) lobbied for a total ban upon growth hormones, opposed, with only partial success, by the pharmaceutical industry, which was not well organized at the time.  (It was not until 1987, at the instigation of US firms, that the European Federation of Animal Health, FEDESA, was formed to represent at EU level the companies that, amongst other things, manufactured growth hormones.) Neither European farmers nor the meat processing industry took any stance on the matter.  With the help of the BEUC consumer boycotts of veal products, sparked in Italy by reports about DES in Italian magazines and in France and Germany by similar reports, spread from those three countries across the whole of the EU, causing companies such as Hipp and Alete to withdraw their lines of veal products, and veal prices to drop significantly in France, Belgium, West Germany, Ireland, and the Netherlands.  Because of the fixed purchases guaranteed by the EU's Common Agricultural Policy, there was a loss of ECU 10 million to the EU's budget.

The imposition of a general ban was encouraged by the European Parliament, with a 1981 resolution passing by a majority of 177:1 in favour of a general ban.  MEPs, having been directly elected for the first time in 1979, were taking the opportunity to flex their political muscles, and were in part using the public attention on the issue to strengthen the Parliament's role.  The Council of Ministers was divided along lines that directly matched each country's domestic stance on growth hormone regulation, with France, Ireland, the U.K., Belgium, Luxembourg, and Germany all opposing a general ban.  The European Commission, leery of a veto by the Council and tightly linked to both pharmaceutical and (via Directorate VI) agricultural interests, presented factual arguments and emphasized the problem of trade barriers.

1998 WTO decision 
The WTO Appellate Body affirmed the WTO Panel conclusion in a report adopted by the WTO Dispute Settlement Body on 13 February 1998.  Section 208 of this report says:

[W]e find that the European Communities did not actually proceed to an assessment, within the meaning of Articles 5.1 and 5.2, of the risks arising from the failure of observance of good veterinary practice combined with problems of control of the use of hormones for growth promotion purposes.  The absence of such risk assessment, when considered in conjunction with the conclusion actually reached by most, if not all, of the scientific studies relating to the other aspects of risk noted earlier, leads us to the conclusion that no risk assessment that reasonably supports or warrants the import prohibition embodied in the EC Directives was furnished to the Panel.  We affirm, therefore, the ultimate conclusions of the Panel that the EC import prohibition is not based on a risk assessment within the meaning of Articles 5.1 and 5.2 of the SPS Agreement and is, therefore, inconsistent with the requirements of Article 5.1. 

On 12 July 1999, an arbitrator appointed by the WTO Dispute Settlement Body authorized the US to impose retaliatory tariffs of US$116.8 million per year on the EU.

EU scientific risk assessments 
In 2002 the EU Scientific Committee on Veterinary Measures relating to Public Health (SCVPH) claimed that the use of beef growth hormones posed a potential health risk, and in 2003 the EU enacted Directive 2003/74/EC to amend its ban, but the US and Canada rejected that the EU had met WTO standards for scientific risk assessment.

The EC made the scientific claim that the hormones used in treating cattle remain in the tissue, specifically the hormone 17-beta estradiol. However, despite this evidence the EC declared there was no clear link to health risks in humans for the other five provisionally banned hormones. The EC has also found high amounts of hormones in areas where there are dense cattle lots. This increase in hormones in the water has affected waterways and nearby wild fish. Contamination of North American waterways by hormones would not, however, have any direct impact on European consumers or their health.

2008 WTO decision 
In November 2004, the EU requested WTO consultations, claiming that the United States should remove its retaliatory measures since the EU has removed the measures found to be WTO-inconsistent in the original case. In 2005, the EU initiated new WTO dispute settlement proceedings against the United States and Canada, and a March 2008 panel report cited fault with all three parties (EU, United States, and Canada) on various substantive and procedural aspects of the dispute. In October 2008, the WTO Appellate Body issued a mixed ruling that allows for continued imposition of trade sanctions on the EU by the United States and Canada, but also allows the EU to continue its ban on imports of hormone-treated beef.

In November 2008, the EU filed a new WTO challenge following the announcement by the USTR that it was seeking comment on possible modification of the list of EU products subject to increased tariffs under the dispute, and in January 2009 the USTR announced changes to the list of EU products subject to increased tariffs. In September 2009, the United States and the European Commission signed a memorandum of understanding, which established a new EU duty-free import quota for grain-fed, high quality beef (HQB) as part of a compromise solution. However, in December 2016, the US took steps to reinstate retaliatory tariffs on the list of EU products under the dispute given continued concerns about US beef access to the EU market, and in August 2019 they agreed establishing an initial duty-free tariff-rate quota of  tonnes annually, phased over seven years to  tonnes (valued at approximately US$420 million) of the EU  tonnes quota of non-hormone treated beef.

Effects upon policy in the EU 
The EU often applies the precautionary principle very stringently in regards to food safety. The precautionary principle means that in a case of scientific uncertainty, the government may take appropriate measures proportionate to the potential risk (EC Regulation 178/2002). In 1996, the EU banned imported beef from the US and continued to do so after the 2003 Mad Cow scare. A more sophisticated risk assessment found there to be insufficient risk to ban certain hormones, but continued to ban others.  Labeling of meat was another option, however warnings were also insufficient because of the criteria specified in the SPS (Sanitary and Phyto-Sanitary agreement). This agreement allows members to use scientifically based measures to protect public health. Most specifically the Equivalence provision in Article 4 which states the following: "an importing country must accept an SPS measure which differs from its own as equivalent if the exporting country’s measure provides the same level of health or environmental protection." Therefore, although the EU is a strong proponent of labels and banning meat that contains growth hormones, requiring the US to do the same would have violated this agreement.

Effects upon public opinion in the US 
One of the effects of the Beef Hormone Dispute in the US was to awaken the public's interest in the issue.  This interest was not wholly unsympathetic to the EU.  In 1989, for example, the Consumer Federation of America and the Center for Science in the Public Interest both pressed for an adoption of a ban within the US similar to that within the EU. US consumers appear to be less concerned with the use of synthetic chemicals in food production. Because of current policy, in which all beef is allowed whether produced with hormones or genetically modified, US consumers now have to rely on their own judgment when buying goods. However, in a study done in 2002, 85% of respondents wanted mandatory labeling on beef produced with growth hormones. The public in general is motivated to purchase organic or natural meats for several reasons. Organic meats and poultry is the fastest growing agricultural sector, from 2002–2003 there was a growth of 77.8%, accounting for $23 billion in the entire organic food market.

See also
Organic food
Genetically modified food controversies
JECFA
Genetically modified organisms
Dispute settlement in the WTO
Pink slime
The World According to Monsanto - a documentary about Monsanto's corporate practices

References

Further reading 
Press Conference by professor Samuel S. Epstein M.D. 1999-05-31

External links

WTO resources

US Government resources

E.U. resources 
 

Beef
Food politics
Trade wars
Environmental controversies
World Trade Organization dispute settlement cases